Budak  may refer to:

Budak (surname)
Budak, Lice
Budak, Lika-Senj County, a village in Croatia
Budak, Zadar County, a village in Croatia